The 1963 Holy Cross Crusaders baseball team represented the College of the Holy Cross in the 1963 NCAA University Division baseball season. The Crusaders played their home games at Fitton Field. The team was coached by Albert Riopel in his 3rd year as head coach at Holy Cross.

The Crusaders won the District I playoff to advance to the College World Series, where they were defeated by the Southern California Trojans.

Roster

Schedule

|-
! style="" | Regular Season
|-

|-
! bgcolor="#DDDDFF" width="3%" | #
! bgcolor="#DDDDFF" width="7%" | Date
! bgcolor="#DDDDFF" width="14%" | Opponent
! bgcolor="#DDDDFF" width="25%" | Site/Stadium
! bgcolor="#DDDDFF" width="5%" | Score
! bgcolor="#DDDDFF" width="5%" | Overall Record
|- align="center" bgcolor="#ccffcc"
| 1 || April 19 ||  || Fitton Field • Worcester, Massachusetts || 6–1 || 1–0
|- align="center" bgcolor="#ffcccc"
| 2 || April 20 ||  || Fitton Field • Worcester, Massachusetts || 5–9 || 1–1
|- align="center" bgcolor="#ccffcc"
| 3 || April 25 ||  || Unknown • Worcester, Massachusetts || 12–0 || 2–1
|- align="center" bgcolor="#ccffcc"
| 4 || April 27 ||  || Fitton Field • Worcester, Massachusetts || 2–1 || 3–1
|-

|-
! bgcolor="#DDDDFF" width="3%" | #
! bgcolor="#DDDDFF" width="7%" | Date
! bgcolor="#DDDDFF" width="14%" | Opponent
! bgcolor="#DDDDFF" width="25%" | Site/Stadium
! bgcolor="#DDDDFF" width="5%" | Score
! bgcolor="#DDDDFF" width="5%" | Overall Record
|- align="center" bgcolor="#ffcccc"
| 5 || May 1 || at  || Unknown • Providence, Rhode Island || 1–2 || 3–2
|- align="center" bgcolor="#ccffcc"
| 6 || May 3 ||  || Fitton Field • Worcester, Massachusetts || 8–2 || 4–2
|- align="center" bgcolor="#ccffcc"
| 7 || May 4 ||  || Fitton Field • Worcester, Massachusetts || 19–1 || 5–2
|- align="center" bgcolor="#ffcccc"
| 8 || May 8 ||  || Fitton Field • Worcester, Massachusetts || 3–9 || 5–3
|- align="center" bgcolor="#ccffcc"
| 9 || May 13 || at  || Soldier's Field • Cambridge, Massachusetts || 2–1 || 6–3
|- align="center" bgcolor="#ccffcc"
| 10 || May  || Providence || Unknown • Unknown || 10–1 || 7–3
|- align="center" bgcolor="#ffcccc"
| 11 || May 21 || at  || Unknown • Amherst, Massachusetts || 1–2 || 7–4
|- align="center" bgcolor="#ccffcc"
| 12 || May  ||  || Unknown • Unknown || 15–1 || 8–4
|-

|-
! style="" | Postseason
|-

|-
! bgcolor="#DDDDFF" width="3%" | #
! bgcolor="#DDDDFF" width="7%" | Date
! bgcolor="#DDDDFF" width="14%" | Opponent
! bgcolor="#DDDDFF" width="25%" | Site/Stadium
! bgcolor="#DDDDFF" width="5%" | Score
! bgcolor="#DDDDFF" width="5%" | Overall Record
|- align="center" bgcolor="#ccffcc"
| 13 || May 29 ||  || John Shea Field • Chestnut Hill, Massachusetts || 4–0 || 9–4
|- align="center" bgcolor="#ccffcc"
| 14 || May 29 || at Boston College || John Shea Field • Chestnut Hill, Massachusetts || 7–4 || 10–4
|-

|-
! bgcolor="#DDDDFF" width="3%" | #
! bgcolor="#DDDDFF" width="7%" | Date
! bgcolor="#DDDDFF" width="14%" | Opponent
! bgcolor="#DDDDFF" width="25%" | Site/Stadium
! bgcolor="#DDDDFF" width="5%" | Score
! bgcolor="#DDDDFF" width="5%" | Overall Record
|- align="center" bgcolor="#ffcccc"
| 15 || May 30 || at Boston College || John Shea Field • Chestnut Hill, Massachusetts || 3–6 || 10–5
|-

|-
! bgcolor="#DDDDFF" width="3%" | #
! bgcolor="#DDDDFF" width="7%" | Date
! bgcolor="#DDDDFF" width="14%" | Opponent
! bgcolor="#DDDDFF" width="25%" | Site/Stadium
! bgcolor="#DDDDFF" width="5%" | Score
! bgcolor="#DDDDFF" width="5%" | Overall Record
|- align="center" bgcolor="#ccffcc"
| 16 || June 1 || Providence || Fitton Field • Worcester, Massachusetts || 11–0 || 11–5
|- align="center" bgcolor="#ccffcc"
| 17 || June 1 || Providence || Fitton Field • Worcester, Massachusetts || 7–4 || 12–5
|-

|-
! bgcolor="#DDDDFF" width="3%" | #
! bgcolor="#DDDDFF" width="7%" | Date
! bgcolor="#DDDDFF" width="14%" | Opponent
! bgcolor="#DDDDFF" width="25%" | Site/Stadium
! bgcolor="#DDDDFF" width="5%" | Score
! bgcolor="#DDDDFF" width="5%" | Overall Record
|- align="center" bgcolor="#ffcccc"
| 18 || June 3 || at  || Red Rolfe Field • Hanover, New Hampshire || 3–6 || 12–6
|- align="center" bgcolor="#ffcccc"
| 19 || June ||  || Unknown • Unknown || 2–3 || 12–7
|- align="center" bgcolor="#ffcccc"
| 20 || June || Boston College || Unknown • Unknown || 0–3 || 12–8
|- align="center" bgcolor="#ccffcc"
| 21 || June || Boston College || Unknown • Unknown || 17–2 || 13–8
|-

|-
! bgcolor="#DDDDFF" width="3%" | #
! bgcolor="#DDDDFF" width="7%" | Date
! bgcolor="#DDDDFF" width="14%" | Opponent
! bgcolor="#DDDDFF" width="25%" | Site/Stadium
! bgcolor="#DDDDFF" width="5%" | Score
! bgcolor="#DDDDFF" width="5%" | Overall Record
|- align="center" bgcolor="#ffcccc"
| 22 || June 10 || vs Missouri || Omaha Municipal Stadium • Omaha, Nebraska || 0–3 || 13–9
|- align="center" bgcolor="#ffcccc"
| 23 || June 11 || vs Southern California || Omaha Municipal Stadium • Omaha, Nebraska || 5–6 || 13–10
|-

|-
|

References

Holy Cross Crusaders baseball seasons
Holy Cross Crusaders baseball
College World Series seasons
Holy Cross